Lars Ploug Jorgensen (born September 1, 1970) is an American former competition swimmer who represented the United States at the 1988 Summer Olympics in Seoul, South Korea.  Jorgensen competed in the preliminary heats of the men's 1,500-meter freestyle, and finished with the twenty-third-best time overall (15:39.51).

Jorgensen is the head coach of the swimming team for the University of Kentucky.  

He is the brother of fellow Olympic swimmer Dan Jorgensen.

In 1995 he set the swim course record with 46:44 for that leg of the Ironman World Championship in Kailua-Kona, Hawaii.  His swim record held until 2018, when Jan Sibbersen set the new fastest swim time in 46:29.  Lars Jorgensen's swim time of 46:41 from 1998 does not count as valid course record as he did not finish the Ironman World Championship that year.

See also
 List of University of Tennessee people

References

1970 births
Living people
American male freestyle swimmers
Olympic swimmers of the United States
Swimmers at the 1987 Pan American Games
Swimmers at the 1988 Summer Olympics
Place of birth missing (living people)
Tennessee Volunteers men's swimmers
Pan American Games silver medalists for the United States
Pan American Games medalists in swimming
Universiade medalists in swimming
Universiade silver medalists for the United States
Medalists at the 1987 Pan American Games
20th-century American people
21st-century American people